The Worshipful Company of Clockmakers was established under a royal charter granted by King Charles I in 1631. It ranks sixty-first among the livery companies of the City of London, and comes under the jurisdiction of the Privy Council. The company established a library and its museum in 1813, which is the oldest specific collection of clocks and watches worldwide. This is administered by the company's affiliated charity, the Clockmakers’ Charity, and is presently housed on the second floor of London's Science Museum. The modern aims of the company and its museum are charitable and educational, in particular to promote and preserve clockmaking and watchmaking, which as of 2019 were added to the HCA Red List of Endangered Crafts.

The Clockmakers’ Museum, comprising a collection of clocks, watches, portraits and ephemera is housed in a new gallery provided by the Science Museum, officially opened by Princess Anne on 22 October 2015. The museum was first established in 1813, and was housed at London's Guildhall from 1874 to 2014. It claims to be the oldest collection specifically of watches and clocks in the world. Though the collection is now housed in the Clockmakers' Museum in South Kensington, the company's archive and library are however still kept at Guildhall Library. The museum collection includes John Harrison's sea watch H5, once personally tested by King George III.

Motto
The company's motto, Tempus Rerum Imperator, can be translated as ‘Time, the Ruler of All Things’. It appears as an epitaph on the tombstone of former British Prime Minister Harold Wilson, a liveryman of the company.

History
Prior to the seventeenth century, clockmaking by native English craftsmen was mostly confined to the production of turret clocks. Domestic clocks and watches were mostly imported or the work of immigrants from the European continent. Because turret clock making involved working in ferrous metal, clockmakers within the City of London tended to be freemen of the Blacksmiths’ Company, though some were members of other livery companies, notably the Clothworkers.

After the loss of many London clock and watchmakers in the plagues of 1598 and 1603, the trade consolidated and began to grow. The continued influx of newcomers led to resentment from those who had become established in London towards outsiders who came to set up in or near the City and who threatened their market. From 1620 onwards, groups of clockmakers attempted to set up their own guild. The Blacksmiths initially succeeded in opposing these moves. Eventually, however, with the king issuing charters as a means of raising much needed finance at a time when he had prorogued Parliament, the clockmakers succeeded in securing a royal charter, on 22 August 1631, to the distress of the Blacksmiths, who could naturally expect to lose members, and therefore income.

The charter gave regulatory authority to the Clockmakers to control the horological trade in the City of London and for a radius of ten miles around. It incorporated a controlling body which should have ‘continuance for ever under the style and name of The Master, Wardens and Fellowship of the Art and Mystery of Clockmaking’. It provided that the fellowship should be governed by a master, three wardens and ten or more assistants who would form the Court. The first master was David Ramsay, a Scot, who had been appointed watchmaker to James VI of Scotland, later James I of England. The noted clockmaker Edward East also formed part of the first court.

The original charter is still in the company's possession and is housed with the rest of its library and archive in the Guildhall Library. The company obtained a grant of arms from the College of Arms in January 1672. In 1766, the Court of Aldermen granted the company its livery. The number of liverymen was originally limited at sixty but has been increased in number over the years by approval of the City of London Corporation and currently stands at a maximum of three hundred.

Horological Training and Awards for Excellence
The company bestows three awards for excellence: the Tompion Medal for outstanding achievements in horology, the Harrison Medal for the propagation of horological knowledge and its appreciation, and the Derek Pratt Prize for innovation, ingenuity, elegance, and the highest standards of workmanship and precision performance in the craft and science of time and timekeeping. The company also closely co-operates with the trustees of the George Daniels Educational Trust in supporting education in horology.

Affiliations
The Clockmakers Company is formally affiliated with the Antiquarian Horological Society, the UCL Observatory, HMS Protector, the Royal Navy's Ice Patrol Ship, HMS Archer, a P264 Class University Royal Naval Unit based in Edinburgh, and XIII Squadron RAF.

Masters

Those who have been Master of the company include the following:

1631, David Ramsay
1636, Elias Allen
1645, 1652 Edward East
1699, Henry Thornton 
1700, Charles Gretton
1702, Joseph Windmills
1703, Thomas Tompion
1708, Daniel Quare
1717 Nathaniel Chamberlain 
1718, Thomas Windmills
1795, 1812 Harry Potter 
1810, 1811 Paul Philipp Barraud
1817, John Roger Arnold
1821, 1823, 1825, 1827, 1847 Benjamin Lewis Vulliamy
1855, 1862 Charles Frodsham
1893, 1894 Revd. Henry Leonard Nelthropp
1902, 1914 William Henry Mahoney Christie KCB FRS
1922, 1931 Sir Frank Watson Dyson KBE FRS FRSE
1926, Hugh Rotherham
1932 Sir Francis Newbolt KC FCS
1946, Lord Iliffe of Yattendon GBE
1949, 1954 Sir Harold Spencer Jones KBE FRS FRSE PRAS
1950, William Hamilton Shortt FBHI
1959, Viscount Falmouth
1960, Lord Harris
1969, Sir Richard van der Riet Woolley OBE FRS
1974, Sir Frank Chalton Francis KCB
1976, Sir Hugh Wontner GBE CVO
1980, George Daniels CBE DSc FBHI FSA AHCI
1986, Viscount Falmouth
1989, Lord Murton of Lindisfarne OBE TD PC
2000, Alexander Boksenberg CBE FRS
2001, Sir George White, Bt, FSA
2002, Michael Monro Smith
2003, Christopher John Hurrion
2004, Philip John Willoughby
2005, Diana Muriel Uff
2006, Maj Gen David Anthony Somerset Pennefather CB OBE
2007, David John Poole FBHI
2008, Dr Michael David Sanderson PhD
2009, Cdr Peter John Linstead-Smith OBE RN
2010, Howard Carl Newman FBHI
2011, Andrew Charles Henry Crisford FSA
2012, Mark Westcombe Elliott FCA
2013, Prof Paul Eugene Marcus Jarrett FRCS
2014, Jonathan Daniel Betts MBE FSA FBHI
2015, Philip William Tennant Whyte, Hon FBHI
2016, Robert Michael Justice Stewart
2017, Roy Charles Harris, FBHI
2018, Andrew Lewis James, FRSA, Hon MBHI
2019, Jonathan Edward Hills
2020, Joanna Migdal (Lady White)
2021, Mark H Levy
2022, Dr James Nye, FSA
2023, Jane Pedler

Company Chaplains and Church
 Father Tim Handley
 St James Garlickhythe

Gallery

See also
British Horological Institute
Clockmakers' Museum
Antiquarian Horological Society
Charles Gretton

References

External links
The Clockmakers' Company

Clockmakers
Horology
1631 establishments in England
Time in the United Kingdom
Horological organizations
British clockmakers